Douglas or Doug Ross may refer to:

 Douglas Ross (Canadian politician) (1883–1961), Canadian politician
 Douglas George Ross (1897–1980), Chief Constable of Sutherland
 Douglas T. Ross (1929–2007), American computer scientist
 Douglas Ross (physicist) (born 1948), British physicist
 Douglas A. Ross (born 1948), Canadian political scientist
 Doug Ross (ice hockey) (1951–2022), American Olympic ice hockey player and coach
 Douglas Ross (Scottish politician) (born 1983), Leader of the Scottish Conservatives, member of the UK parliament, member of the Scottish parliament
 Doug Ross, fictional character from the television series ER